Emil Steinbach (November 15, 1849 – December 6, 1919) was a German conductor and composer. He was particularly known for his interpretations of the works of Richard Wagner. He notably conducted the first public performance of Wagner's Siegfried Idyll in 1877.

Born in Lengenrieden, Baden, Steinbach was the elder brother and first music teacher of the composer and conductor Fritz Steinbach and the great uncle of Peter Maag. He studied under Hermann Levi at the Leipzig Conservatory from 1867–1869. From 1871–74 he was Kapellmeister in Mannheim; from 1874–77 he was Hofkapellmeister of the orchestra at the Opera in Darmstadt. He finally served as the first Chief Music Director of the Philharmonisches Staatsorchester Mainz (founded in 1876) from 1877 to 1909. In 1893 he conducted Wagner's Tristan und Isolde and Siegfried at the Royal Opera House at Covent Garden in London, to unenthusiastic reviews. He died in Mainz in 1919.

His compositional output consists of orchestral works, chamber music, and songs.

Sources
 Kuratorium Meiningen: Stadtlexikon Meiningen, Bielsteinverlag Meiningen, 2008. 

1849 births
1919 deaths
German composers
German conductors (music)
German male conductors (music)
19th-century German musicians
19th-century German male musicians